On 13–14 January 2023, Islamist insurgents attacked Sarband Police Station in Peshawar, Khyber Pakhtunkhwa, Pakistan, which was repelled by police personnel. Three policemen including DSP Sardar Hussain were killed in the gun and grenade attack. The Pakistani Taliban claimed responsibility for it.

See also
Peshawar attack
2023 Karachi police station attack
Terrorist incidents in Pakistan in 2023

References

2023 in Khyber Pakhtunkhwa
2023 murders in Asia
2020s crimes in Khyber Pakhtunkhwa 
2020s murders in Pakistan
Attacks on buildings and structures in 2023
Attacks on buildings and structures in Peshawar
Attacks on police stations in Asia
Attacks on police stations in the 2020s
Grenade attacks
Islamic terrorist incidents in 2023
January 2023 crimes in Asia
January 2023 events in Pakistan
Murder in Peshawar
Tehrik-i-Taliban Pakistan attacks
Terrorist incidents in Pakistan in 2023
Terrorist incidents in Peshawar